Ari Rennert is an American businessman, the president of Renco Group, a private holding company founded in 1975 by his father, Ira Rennert.

Biography
Rennert has a bachelor's degree in finance from the Stern School of Business at New York University.

He has worked for Credit Suisse First Boston and Caxton Associates.

Rennert joined Renco Group in 2005, and was chief investment officer before becoming president in 2011.

Rennert is married to Erynne Rivkah Novetsky, and they live in Manhattan with their three sons.

References

Businesspeople from New York (state)
American people of Polish-Jewish descent
American people of Romanian-Jewish descent
American people of Swedish descent
Living people
New York University Stern School of Business alumni
Year of birth missing (living people)